This is a list of Irish musicians and musical groups.

Jazz & Blues 

 Josephine Alexandra Mitchell (1903–1995) was Ireland's first female saxophonist.
 Louis Stewart (1944–2016), guitarist

Tenors 
 The Irish Tenors

Musicians
Máire McDonnell-Garvey
Sharon Shannon
Luan Parle

Singers

Bands

 Aslan
 B*Witched
 Boomtown Rats
 Boyzone
 The Chieftains
 The Cranberries
 The Corrs
 The Dubliners
 The Fureys
 Hothouse Flowers
 Horslips
 Hozier
 Kerbdog
 Kodaline
 Planxty
 The Pogues
 The Script
 Stiff Little Fingers
 Thin Lizzy
 U2
The Clancy Brothers 
 The Undertones
 Westlife
 The Wolfe Tones

Songwriters

References

Musicians
Irish